The 1985 Italian Athletics Championships was the 75th edition of the Italian Athletics Championships and were held in Rome from 9 to 11 July 1985.

Champions
The table also includes the national champions of non-track and field events whose competitions were not held in Rome.
 

Full results.

Men

Women

References

External links 
 Italian Athletics Federation

Italian Athletics Championships
Athletics
Italian Athletics Outdoor Championships
Athletics competitions in Italy